Infantile hemangiopericytoma is a cutaneous condition characterized by single or multiple dermal and subcutaneous nodules that may be alarmingly large at birth or grow rapidly.

See also 
 Hemangiopericytoma
 List of cutaneous conditions

References 

Dermal and subcutaneous growths